Lisa Thompson may refer to:

 Lisa Thompson (author) (born 1973), British author
 Lisa Thompson (politician) (born 1965), politician in Ontario, Canada
 Lisa Thompson (set decorator), Australian set decorator
 Lisa Joann Thompson (born 1969), American dancer, choreographer, actress and model